goto is a statement found in many computer programming languages.

Goto may also refer to:

Places
 Gotō, Nagasaki, a city in Japan
 Gotō Islands, Japanese islands in the East China Sea

People
 Gotō (surname), a Japanese surname, including a list of people with the name
 Kazushige Goto, a software engineer who developed the highly optimized GotoBLAS linear algebra library

Arts, entertainment, and media
 G0-T0, a droid in the video game Star Wars: Knights of the Old Republic II – The Sith Lords
 Goto Dengo, a character in Neal Stephenson's 1999 novel Cryptonomicon
 The Goto Family, a powerful Yakuza family from The Raid 2
  Hideaki Goto, Yakuza boss and head of Goto Family
 Keiichi Goto, son of Hideaki Goto and heir of Goto Family

Organizations
 GoTo.com, later Overture Services, Inc., a pay-for-placement Internet search service acquired by Yahoo!
 Goto-gumi, a Japanese yakuza organization
 GoTo (Indonesian company), an Indonesian holding company which is the parent company of Gojek and Tokopedia
 GoTo (US company), an American software company based in Boston, Massachusetts. Formerly known as LogMeIn, Inc.

Other uses
 GoTo (telescopes), a type of telescope mount and related software
 Goto (food), a kind of Philippine rice congee
~Go To~, an alternative name for the 2019 Bring Me the Horizon album Music to Listen To...

See also
 Go (disambiguation)